Giovanni Battista Albani (died 1588) was a Roman Catholic prelate who served as Patriarch of Alexandria (1586–1588).

Biography
On 24 March 1586, Giovanni Battista Albani was appointed during the papacy of Pope Sixtus V as Titular Patriarch of Alexandria. On 30 Mar 1586, he was consecrated bishop by Giulio Antonio Santorio, Cardinal-Priest of San Bartolomeo all'Isola, with Filippo Mocenigo, Archbishop of Nicosia, and Giuseppe Donzelli, Archbishop of Sorrento, serving as co-consecrators. He served as Patriarch of Alexandria until his death on 1588.

Episcopal succession
While Patriarch, he was the principal co-consecrator of:
Antonio Migliori, Bishop of San Marco (1586); 
Costanzo de Sarnano, Bishop of Vercelli (1587); 
Ferdinand de Rye, Archbishop of Besançon (1587); 
Fabio Biondi, Patriarch of Jerusalem (1588); and 
Owen Lewis (bishop), Bishop of Cassano all'Jonio (1588).

References

External links and additional sources
 (for Chronology of Bishops)
 (for Chronology of Bishops)

16th-century Roman Catholic titular bishops
Bishops appointed by Pope Sixtus V
1588 deaths
Patriarchs of Alexandria